Garden Cliff is a  geological Site of Special Scientific Interest in Gloucestershire, notified in 1954.

Location and geology
The site is near Westbury on Severn in the Forest of Dean district. This is an important research site for Rhaetic studies and was first described in some detail in 1822. It shows a complete local succession from the Tea Green Maria to the base of the Lower Lias.  This is the type locality for the Westbury Bed and the site includes several bone beds. The site is important for comparative studies of the Rhaetic.

Conservation
A Natural England report of August 2011 reports its good condition.

References

SSSI Source
 Natural England SSSI information on the citation
 Natural England SSSI information on the Garden Cliff unit

External links
 Natural England (SSSI information)

Sites of Special Scientific Interest in Gloucestershire
Sites of Special Scientific Interest notified in 1954
Forest of Dean